Albán is a municipality and town of Colombia in the department of Cundinamarca.

Veredas
The municipality is divided into 14 veredas.
 Centro
 Chavarro
 Chimbe
 El Entable
 Garbanzal
 Guayacundo Alto
 Guayacundo Bajo
 Java
 Las Marías
 Los Alpes
 Namay Alto
 Namay Bajo
 Pantanillo
 San Rafael

External links 

Municipalities of Cundinamarca Department